The Apollo Monsoon is a Hungarian ultralight trike, designed and produced by Apollo Ultralight Aircraft of Eger. The aircraft is supplied as a kit for amateur construction or as a complete ready-to-fly-aircraft.

Design and development
Designed especially for the American market in conjunction with their US distributor, the Monsoon was intended to comply with the Fédération Aéronautique Internationale microlight category as well as the US light-sport aircraft category. It features a cable-braced or strut-braced hang glider-style high-wing, weight-shift controls, a two-seats-in-tandem, open cockpit, tricycle landing gear with wheel pants and a single engine in pusher configuration.

The Monsoon is accepted in the United States as both an Experimental and Special Light-sport aircraft.

The aircraft is made from bolted-together aluminum tubing, with its double surface wing covered in Dacron sailcloth. The aircraft uses an "A" frame weight-shift control bar. The landing gear has all three wheels independently  suspended and each wheel is equipped with disc brakes. A parking brake is also fitted. The powerplant options include the twin cylinder, liquid-cooled, two-stroke, dual-ignition  Rotax 582 engine, the four cylinder, air and liquid-cooled, four-stroke, dual-ignition  Rotax 912 or  Rotax 912S engine. Engine air-cooling is facilitated by an under-fuselage air scoop.

A number of different wings can be fitted to the basic carriage, including the cable-braced Aeros Profi, the strut-braced Aeros Profi TL and the North Wing Reflex 11 or 13. Early examples were provided with the  strut-braced Gibbogear Manta Ray 12.5 wing.  Available options include the Ballistic Recovery Systems 1050 ballistic parachute and an Enigma colour glass combination EFIS/GPS system.

Specifications (Monsoon AS-IV)

References

External links

2000s Hungarian sport aircraft
2000s Hungarian ultralight aircraft
Light-sport aircraft
Single-engined pusher aircraft
Ultralight trikes
Apollo Ultralight Aircraft aircraft